Fitawrari Habte Giyorgis Dinagde (1851 – 12 December 1926) also known by his horse name Abba Mechal was an Ethiopian military commander and government official who, among several other posts, served as President of the Council of Ministers and as Minister of War during the reigns of Menelik II, Zewditu and Haile Selassie. He was also Shum or Governor of Borena, Ibat, and Mecha.

Early life

Fitawrari Habte Giyorgis Dinagde was born in Čabo, a district in Southwestern Shewa bordering the Gurage region. His ethnicity is disputed with claims that he was an ethnic Gurage. and others claiming he was an ethnic Oromo. He was trained in the art of warfare and later promoted to a high rank in the empire's army under Emperor Menelik II. He was a young prisoner of war, along with Dajazmach Balcha Safo, and was found in South West Shewa. His early life isn't well documented, though many believe he came from a humble family. He was later taken to Ankober, Menelik's Shewan capital, before Addis Ababa. As a young man he joined the forces of Menelik, then-King of Shewa.

Military career

 
Habte Giyorgis played a leading role in several important battles of Ethiopian history. In one of Menelik's expeditions Habte Giyorgis was raised from  a junior officer to a lieutenant because of his bravery and talent in the early 1890s. He participated in many battles, including the Battle of Adwa. In October 1896 Habte Giyorgis was appointed as chief of the army after Fitawrari Gabayahu Gurmu (Abba Gora) was killed during the Battle of Adwa.

Borena Campaign 
During Menelik's expansion of the empire between 1897-1898 Habte Giyorgis was assigned in subjugating the Borena region. After raising an army of 15,000, Fitawrari Habte Giyorgis set out for Borena in June of 1897 from West Shewa. On July 31st, his army arrived at Borena at a place called Sogida in which they built a fort at Mega. The Abba Gadaa of Borena, Addi Doyyo, with the advice of the local Gadaa assembly decided submit to Fitawrari Habte Giyorgis's army to avoid war. After his successful campaign in Borena, Menelik made Habte Giyorgis Shum, equivalent as governor, of Borena adding the Shewan provinces of "Mecha and Jibat as a reward".

Deposing of Lij Iyasu 
During the deposing of Lij Iyasu, Fitawrari Habte Giyorgis  led the army against forces loyal to Lij Iyasu. He was the commanding General during the Battle of Segale in which Fitawrari Habte Giyorgis's army decisively defeated Lij Iyasu's father Negus Mikael of Wollo.

Political potentiate
However, he grew to become a skilled military leader and statesman.  He was also a central figure in the coup which removed Taytu from power during the period of Menelik II's incapacitation as well as the 1916 coup which deposed Lij Iyasu and put Empress Zewditu in power.

From 1909 to 1926, Habte Giyorgis was Chief Minister (equivalent to the late title of Prime Minister) of the Council of Ministers to the Emperor of Ethiopia. He was an important figure in the Ethiopian Empire often cited for his great skills as military commander and judiciary.

Legacy
A street in Addis Ababa are named after him. He is still today renowned for his wisdom, judiciary, and his military skills.

See also
 Battle of Segale
 Ethiopian historiography
 Ethiopian Empire
 List of emperors of Ethiopia

References

External links
 World Statesmen

1851 births
1927 deaths
Ethiopian nobility
Foreign ministers of Ethiopia
Government ministers of Ethiopia
Defence ministers of Ethiopia
People from Gurage Zone
20th-century Ethiopian politicians